Tomás de Iriarte (or Yriarte) y Oropesa (Puerto de la Cruz, La Orotava, island of Tenerife, 18 September 1750Madrid, 17 September 1791), was a Spanish neoclassical poet.

Life 
Tomás was born to the Iriarte family, many of whose members were writers in the humanist tradition. His father was Don Bernardo de Iriarte, while his mother was Doña Bárbara de las Nieves Hernández de Oropesa.  His brother was Bernardo de Iriarte

He received his literary education at Madrid where he went aged 14 in 1764 under the care of his uncle, Juan de Iriarte (Puerto de la Cruz, 1701Madrid 1771), librarian to the king of Spain. In his eighteenth year the nephew began his literary career by translating French plays for the royal theatre, and in 1770, under the anagram of Tirso Imarete, he published an original comedy entitled Hacer que hacemos.

In the following year he became official translator at the foreign office, and in 1776 keeper of the records in the war department. In 1780 he authored a didactic poem in silvas entitled La Música, which attracted some attention in Italy as well as at home.

The Fábulas literarias (1782), with which his name is most intimately associated, are composed in a great variety of metres, and was known for humorous attacks on literary men and methods, as was the case, again and again,  with Juan Pablo Forner (1756–1797).

During his later years, partly in consequence of the Fábulas, Iriarte was absorbed in personal controversies, and in 1786 was reported to the Inquisition for his sympathies with the French philosophers.

He died of gout at Madrid, 17 September 1791, aged only 41.

He is the subject of an exhaustive monograph (1897) by Emilio Cotarelo y Mori, (Vegadeo, 1 May 1857Madrid, 27 January 1936), member of the Royal Spanish Academy,  just that year.

See also
 Fable
 Spanish Enlightenment literature

Notes

References

 B. A. Boggs, "La música, poema por Tomás de Iriarte. A Critical Edition", Newark, Delaware: Juan de la Cuesta (2007), 275 pages.
 
 E. Cotrelo y Mori, Iriarte y su época, Madrid, (1897), 588 pages.
 R. M. Cox, Tomas de Iriarte, Twayne Publ., New York, (1972), 161 pages.
 D. M. Guigoy y Costa, El Puerto de la Cruz y los Iriarte, Tenerife, (1945), 310 pages.
 Didier and Denise Ozanam,  Les Diplomats espagnols du XVIII siecle: introduction et repertoire biographique (1700–1808), Ed. Casa de Velázquez, Madrid, (1998), 578 pages,
.

External links 

 Fábulas Literarias Fábulas Literarias complete (Spanish)
 
 

Spanish poets
Writers from the Canary Islands
French–Spanish translators
Spanish dramatists and playwrights
Spanish male dramatists and playwrights
People from Puerto de la Cruz
1750 births
1791 deaths
Spanish male poets
18th-century translators